The Albastar A1 is a Slovenian mid-wing, T-tailed, single-seat motor glider that was designed by Pavel Potočnik and produced by Albastar Ltd.

Design and development
The A1 is a self-launching glider, with the standard  Rotax 447 mounted in tractor configuration on a retractable pylon behind the cockpit. When retracted the engine is hidden behind two doors. The German importer of the glider equipped his aircraft with a Hirth engine instead of the Rotax powerplant.

The A1 is of mixed composite construction and is built from a combination of carbon-fiber-reinforced polymer, kevlar and PVC foam. The  span wing features winglets and produces a 40:1 glide ratio. The landing gear is a retractable monowheel gear. The price of the A1 in 2003 was €39,900.

Specifications (2003 model A1)

See also

References

2000s Slovenian sailplanes
Albastar Ltd aircraft